Cyphelium notarisii or soot lichen is a species of lichenised fungus in the family Caliciaceae. Found in Europe and North America, it grows on wood, often in coastal areas. The species was first described as Acolium notarisii by Charles Tulasne in 1852.

References

Teloschistales
Lichens described in 1852
Lichens of Europe
Lichens of North America
Lichen species
Taxa named by Edmond Tulasne